North Fambridge railway station is on the Crouch Valley Line in the East of England, serving the village of North Fambridge, Essex. The Engineer's Line Reference for the line is WIS; the station's three-letter station code is NFA. The southern (westbound) platform has an operational length for eight-coach trains while the northern (eastbound) platform can accommodate nine coaches.

The line and station were opened for goods on 1 June 1889 and to passenger services on 1 October 1889 by the Great Eastern Railway. Facilities then included two platforms, both provided with buildings and linked by a footbridge; a goods yard including cattle pens; and a 30-lever signal box, reduced to 10 after 1966. The signal box was taken out of use on 1 December 1985 and demolished in February 1986. The original footbridge was replaced with a higher one prior to the electrification of the line in 1986. Electrification using 25 kV overhead line electrification (OLE) was completed on 12 May 1986.

North Fambridge station is currently managed by Greater Anglia, which also operates all trains serving it.

As North Fambridge is at the midpoint of this single-track line, its double-track configuration provides a passing loop to allow two trains to run on the line at any one time. The station was originally called Fambridge (with the code FAM) but this was changed to North Fambridge on 20 May 2007.

References

External links

History of the Crouch Valley Line
Local information about Crouch Valley Line

Railway stations in Essex
DfT Category F2 stations
Former Great Eastern Railway stations
Greater Anglia franchise railway stations
Railway stations in Great Britain opened in 1889
William Neville Ashbee railway stations
1889 establishments in England